Standing on the Outside: The Songs of Cold Chisel is a tribute album dedicated to the songs of Australian band Cold Chisel. The album features 18 songs recorded by Australian and New Zealand artists The Living End, Dallas Crane, Pete Murray, Ben Lee, Thirsty Merc, Evermore, Paul Kelly, Troy Cassar-Daley, Grinspoon, You Am I, Katie Noonan, Something for Kate, Alex Lloyd, Shane Nicholson, The Waifs, Sarah Blasko, Augie March and The Flairz.

Standing on the Outside was conceived by Ed St John of Warner Australia as a tribute to the label's best-selling Australian act. The album featured liner notes by Glenn A. Baker. A special edition featured a second CD containing the original 18 Cold Chisel songs. The album peaked at number 2 on the ARIA Charts and was certified platinum.

Track listing

Charts

Weekly charts

Year-end charts

Certifications

References

Cold Chisel tribute albums
Compilation albums by Australian artists
Rock albums by Australian artists
2007 compilation albums
Rhino Records compilation albums
Rock compilation albums